Sennar is one of the 18 wilayat or states of Sudan. It has an area of 37,844 km² and a population of approximately 1,100,000 (2000).

Location

Sinar State is delimited by Al-Gazira State in the north, The Blue Nile State in the south, Al-Gedaref State and the Sudanese Ethiopian borders in the east, and the White Nile State & the Upper Nile State of South Sudan in the west. It remains unknown whether Singa is the capital of Sennar State or whether the largest city Sennar (also known as Mukwar) is the capital, as some sources and maps list Singa and some list Sennar city. Other commercial towns include El-Suki and El-Dinder.

Population and livelihood

thumb|left|200px|Farming in Sennar

The main economic activity is agriculture, with the irrigated scheme of Suki, the sugar factory of Sennar, and a number of fruit growers (including bananas and mangoes) located on the banks of the Blue Nile. In terms of education The University Of Sennar is the only higher education university throughout all the state, attended by all its residents.

Main cities 
 Singa (one of the 2 possible capitals)
 Sennar (the other possible capital)
 El Suki
 Dindir
 Aldali & Almazmom
 East Sinnar
 Abohugar

Tourism 
The state is famous for its Dinder National Park.

See also
Wad al-'Abbas

References

 
States of Sudan